Rede Mulher was a Free-to-air television broadcaster from Brazil founded on August 8, 1994.
Though the broadcast was made from the city of Araraquara, in the central region of the state of São Paulo, all of its television productions was produced in the broadcaster's studios in the capital, São Paulo. Since the channel's debut, the IBOPE (measure of channel popularity) has been relatively low.

Promising to invest in quality and in the workers, the Universal Church, bought part of the station in 1999 through Edir Macedo.

Shortly after the purchase of the broadcaster, Edir Macedo moved the headquarters of Rede Mulher to the old premises of Rede Record, at Miruna Avenue  in Moema—unoccupied since the broadcast moved to the Barra Funda neighborhood in 1995. From this, structural investments in the channel began. In September 2000, Rede Mulher invested US$ 500.000 in the acquisition of a new digital capture and completion system, reworked its studios and launched new programs. In early 2001, a news department was created and new news programs started.

In mid-December 2004, Rede Mulher had to answer a lawsuit in the 5th Federal Civil Court, for showing programs of the Universal Church of the Kingdom of God that "demonize Afro-Brazilian religions, such as candomblé and umbanda" because they be referred to with terms such as "backrest," "demons," "witchcraft" and "witchcraft". Rede Mulher stated that "programs are the responsibility of those who produce them." The broadcaster was accused of racism along with Rede Record.

With low IBOPE, Rede Record developed a project for a future 24-hour news channel entitled Record News, between the end of 2006 and the beginning of 2007. With the expansion of Rede Mulher into hundreds of Brazilian municipalities, it was defined that the broadcaster would give way to the new one as soon as it was launched. At midnight on September 27 of 2007, Rede Mulher went offline after the Realidade Atual program, when it was officially replaced by Record News with the exhibition of a countdown to 8 pm on September 27, when TV Record São Paulo turned 54. And so, the professionals of Rede Mulher were mostly dismissed.

Until the present day, Rede Record shows no interest in bringing back to Rede Mulher. Besides that the station did not mark a good IBOPE, however, both the logo and the name of the station still belong to Record.

References

Portuguese-language television networks
Women's interest channels
Television channels and stations disestablished in 2007
Television channels and stations established in 1994